Tupi Futebol Clube, commonly referred to as Tupi, is a Brazilian football club based in Estádio Municipal Rubro-Negro Hinterholz em Crissiumal, Rio Grande do Sul. It currently plays in Campeonato Gaúcho Série A2, the second level of the Rio Grande do Sul state football league.

History
The club was founded on May 1, 1949. They finished in the second place in the Campeonato Gaúcho Third Level in 1969, losing the competition to Três Passos. Tupy won the Campeonato Gaúcho Third Level in 2013.

Achievements
 Campeonato Gaúcho Third Level:
 Winners (1): 2013

Stadium
Tupy Futebol Clube play their home games at Estádio Elias Ozias Zoltan, nicknamed Estádio Municipal Rubro-Negro. The stadium has a maximum capacity of 3,000 people.

References

Association football clubs established in 1949
Football clubs in Rio Grande do Sul
1949 establishments in Brazil